State Route 690 (SR 690) is a north–south state highway in southeastern Ohio, a U.S. state.

This two-lane state highway was established in the late 1930s.  Running entirely within Athens County, SR 690 passes through Wayne National Forest and serves as a quicker route connecting SR 550 to the Athens Bypass.

Route description
SR 690 runs exclusively within Athens County.  This state highway is not included as a part of the National Highway System, a network of highways deemed to be most important for the economy, mobility and defense of the nation.

History
SR 690 was designated in 1937 along the routing that it occupies to this day.  Originally in Canaanville, the route's southern terminus was located slightly west of where it is currently located along US 50. By 1997, the route was moved to its current alignment and part of its former alignment has been retained as a state highway as the  SR 690-J. Other than the aforementioned realignment and the fact that the highway intersecting the route at its northern terminus was originally designated as US 50 Alternate before later becoming SR 550, the highway has not experienced any major changes to its routing since it first appeared.

Major intersections

References

External links

690
Transportation in Athens County, Ohio